Robert Emmiyan (born 16 February 1965 in Leninakan, Armenian SSR) is a retired long jumper who represented the USSR and Armenia. He is the fourth best long jumper in history and the best long jumper not of African descent. His personal best jump of 8.86 metres, which he achieved in Tsaghkadzor in May 1987, is the current European record.

Emmiyan received the Honoured Master of Sports of the USSR award in 1987.

An annual track and field meeting in Artashat, Armenia has been held in his honour since 2001 – the Emmiyan Cup.

Biography
At age 16, Robert Emmiyan jumped 7.77 meters, the best jump in the world for his age group.

Emmiyan started competing for the Soviet Union in athletics on an international level in 1981.

At the 1985 IAAF World Cup, Emmiyan came in second place.

In 1986, Emmiyan won the 1986 European Athletics Indoor Championships in Madrid with a jump of 8.32 meters.

Emmiyan won the gold medal at the 1986 European Championships with a jump of 8.41 metres, setting a new championship record. Teammate Sergey Layevskiy was the only other man to jump over eight metres, jumping 8.01m, in a dominant victory by Emmiyan. Emmiyan's record in the Championship still remains unbroken.

The inaugural politically contested 1986 Goodwill Games in Moscow saw Emmiyan win the gold medal in the long jump and set a new European record – 8.61 meters.

In what was a great year for Emmiyan, he had the best jump of 1986.

In 1987, Emmiyan won the 1987 European Athletics Indoor Championships again, making it his second consecutive gold medal at the championships, and set a European record for the long jump indoors – 8.49 meters.

Emmiyan participated at the 1987 European Cup and came in first place. Emmiyan set the Cup's long jump record at 8.38 meters. This record was never surpassed and remained when the Cup became defunct in 2006.

On 22 May 1987, in the high land of Tsaghkadzor (1840 meters above sea level) Emmiyan jumped 8.86 meters. At that time, it was the second best jump ever, after a record jump of Bob Beamon (8.90 meters) in Mexico City in 1968. Later, only Michael Powell (8.95 meters) and Carl Lewis (8.87 meters) jumped farther than Emmiyan. Thus, Emmiyan's jump of 8.86 meters from 1988 is currently the fourth best jump of all time, the first 29-foot jump since Bob Beamon's 1968 world record, and is also the current European record.

Emmiyan won a silver medal with a score of 8.53 meters, finishing second behind Carl Lewis (8.67 meters) at the 1987 World Championships in Athletics in Rome.

Emmiyan was a big medal favorite for the 1988 Olympic Games in Seoul. However, he got injured in the qualifying rounds and was unable to continue.

At the end of that year in December, Emmiyan's hometown of Gyumri was hit by an earthquake that destroyed much of the city and claimed the lives of many people, including Emmiyan's father.

Emmiyan was still able to train and remain in good shape. He continued to jump over 8.20 and 8.30 meters. But the mental toll caused by the earthquake remained. Long jumping requires a great deal of focus and concentration. Emmiyan began to decline athletically and his goal of breaking the world record was fading. He claimed his life and career had "changed from what it had been before."

At the 1990 European Athletics Indoor Championships in Glasgow, Emmiyan won the bronze medal with a score of 8.06 meters.

Emmiyan's last major success came at the 1991 European Cup, where he came in second place.

In 1991, Emmiyan started competing for his now independent country of Armenia. At the 1996 Summer Olympics in Atlanta, with a jump of 7.76 meters he failed to qualify for the finals, finishing in 28th place. Emmiyan soon retired from competitions.

Emmiyan is now the President of the Armenian athletics federation as of April 2010.

Personal life
When the 1988 Armenian earthquake occurred on 7 December, Emmiyan's home in the town of Gyumri was heavily damaged. His father was killed and other members of his family also perished. Emmiyan suffered psychological problems following the earthquake which weakened his mentality for long jumping.

Some time after his career ended, Emmiyan moved to Paris, France.  Emmiyan married a woman from the Armenian community and with her has two daughters, Fiona and Lauren. His family speak Armenian at home and one day, Emmiyan hopes to return to Armenia.  It is difficult for him to live away from his homeland, but he has more time to contribute to the development of athletics in Armenia from afar.

Achievements

See also
Armenian records in athletics

References

External links

1965 births
Living people
Sportspeople from Gyumri
Soviet Armenians
Soviet male long jumpers
Armenian male long jumpers
Honoured Masters of Sport of the USSR
Athletes (track and field) at the 1988 Summer Olympics
Athletes (track and field) at the 1996 Summer Olympics
Olympic athletes of the Soviet Union
Olympic athletes of Armenia
World Athletics Championships medalists
European Athletics Championships medalists
World Athletics Championships athletes for the Soviet Union
World Athletics Championships athletes for Armenia
Universiade medalists in athletics (track and field)
Goodwill Games medalists in athletics
Universiade silver medalists for the Soviet Union
Medalists at the 1985 Summer Universiade
Competitors at the 1986 Goodwill Games
Competitors at the 1990 Goodwill Games